Crystal Liu (born An Feng; August 25, 1987), better known by her stage name Liu Yifei, is a Chinese-American actress, singer, and model. She has appeared multiple times on Forbes China Celebrity 100 list and was named one of the New Four Dan actresses of China in 2009. She is widely known as "Fairy Sister" in China.

In 2020, Liu became known to international audiences for starring as the titular character in the Disney live-action film Mulan. The role earned her nominations for a Critics' Choice Super Award, a Kids' Choice Award and a Saturn Award.

Early life
Liu was born in Tongji Hospital in Wuhan, Hubei as An Feng. She is an only child. Her father is An Shaokang, a 1st Secretary in the Chinese Embassy in France and a French language university professor from Beijing,  and her mother is Liu Xiaoli, a dancer and stage performer from Hubei. Her parents divorced when she was 10 years old, and she was raised solely by her mother. That same year, she adopted her mother's surname and changed her name to "Liu Ximeizi". Her godfather is Chen Jinfei, the Chairman of Beijing Tongchan Investment Group.

In 1997, when Liu was 10 years old, she and her mother immigrated to the United States. She lived in Queens, New York City where she attended Louis Pasteur Middle School 67. In 2002, she returned to China to pursue an acting career and took the stage name "Liu Yifei". Several weeks after returning to China, Liu was accepted into the Performance Institute of Beijing Film Academy at age 15 and graduated in 2006.

Career

2003–2006; Rising popularity
Immediately after her admittance into the Beijing Film Academy, Liu received offers to star in various television series. Her first television appearance in 2003 was in the period romance drama The Story of a Noble Family (金粉世家), based on Zhang Henshui's novel of the same name. The series achieved the highest ratings on CCTV, and positive reviews from audience. The same year, she was chosen by Zhang Jizhong to play Wang Yuyan in Demi-Gods and Semi-Devils, an adaptation of Louis Cha's wuxia novel of the same title. The series was broadcast in Taiwan and achieved a rating of 5.69, becoming the highest-rated Chinese drama in Taiwan. Liu's role as the beautiful Wang Yuyan earned her the nickname of "Fairy Sister" by the media and fans.

In 2005, Liu starred in Chinese Paladin, a fantasy action drama adapted from the role-playing game The Legend of Sword and Fairy. The drama earned a cult following, and solidified her popularity in China.

After the drama aired, Liu gained acclaim for her performance and swiftly experienced a surge in popularity. The same year, she was chosen as the "Golden Eagle Goddess" at the 6th China Golden Eagle TV Art Festival.

2008–2013; Transition to films
After achieving success in television, Liu then ventured onto the big screen. In 2007, she joined William Morris Agency (WMA) and was subsequently cast in her first Hollywood production, The Forbidden Kingdom. She played Golden Sparrow, an orphan seeking revenge against her parents' killer. Thereafter, she starred in romantic-comedy Love in Disguise (2010) opposite Taiwanese singer-actor Wang Leehom.

In 2011, she starred in fantasy supernatural film A Chinese Ghost Story, adapted from Strange Stories from a Chinese Studio; The same year, she was cast as Wu Qing (Emotionless) in Gordon Chan's wuxia film The Four, adapted from Woon Swee Oan's novel series The Four Great Constables. She subsequently reprised her role in two other installments of the film series.

Liu won the Best Actress award at the fifth Macau International Movie Festival for her role as Lingju and Diaochan in the historical film The Assassins (2012).

2014–present; International collaborations and television comeback
In 2014, Liu collaborated with Korean actor-singer Rain for the romance film For Love or Money, based on Hong Kong novelist Amy Cheung's 2006 novel of the same name. Though it did reasonably well at the box office, the film was criticized for its storyline and production.

Liu starred in The Third Way of Love (2015) Her performance in the film led to her win for the Most Anticipated Actress award at the 16th Chinese Film Media Awards. The same year, she was named the first Chinese ambassador of Dior Prestige and became the global ambassador of Tissot.

In 2016, Liu starred in romance film Night Peacock, a Chinese-France co-production directed by Dai Sijie. She then starred in the youth romance film So Young 2: Never Gone.

In 2017, Liu starred in romantic fantasy film Once Upon a Time by award-winning director Anthony LaMolinara and Zhao Xiaoding. She also starred in the historical film The Chinese Widow directed by Bille August. The film premiered at the Shanghai International Film Festival as the opening film, and Liu was nominated as Best Actress. The same year, Liu reunited with White Vengeance co-star Feng Shaofeng in the fantasy comedy film Hanson and the Beast.

In November 2017, Liu was cast as Mulan in the live action adaptation of the 1998 Disney animated film, which was released in 2020 to mixed reviews.

In December 2017, it was announced that Liu will star in the upcoming fantasy mystery television series, The Love of Hypnosis. This marks her first small-screen comeback in 12 years.

Controversy
In August 2019, Liu reshared an image posted by Chinese newspaper People's Daily, an official newspaper of the Central Committee of the Chinese Communist Party. The image included a quote from Chinese reporter Fu Guohao who worked for People's Daily-owned tabloid Global Times and was subsequently assaulted by protesters after stating during the 2019–20 Hong Kong protests: "I support Hong Kong police. You can beat me now. What a shame for Hong Kong." This sparked international controversy, with Liu being accused of supporting police brutality. Following this, the hashtag #BoycottMulan started trending supporting a boycott of the movie. In response to the controversy, Liu was not present at the 2019 D23 Expo, which gave fans an exclusive sneak peek of Mulan. When asked about the controversy in February 2020, Liu stated: "I think it's just a very sensitive situation."

During an interview with Variety magazine at the premiere of Mulan on March 10, 2020, Liu described herself as "Asian" instead of "Chinese", which caused anger among some Chinese social media netizens, who threatened to boycott the movie and accused her of forgetting her roots, as well as questioning why a non-Chinese national was playing the "legendary Chinese icon".

In March 2021, Liu cut ties with clothing brand Adidas over its support for the Better Cotton Initiative - a group funded by the United States government via USAID - after the trade body pulled out of Xinjiang, China citing concerns of forced labour involving Uighur Muslims. The move was echoed by other Chinese celebrities as part of a broader campaign by the Chinese Government to pressure Western brands and consumers into continuing their purchase of cotton produced in the region.

Music career
Liu signed with Sony Music Entertainment Japan in 2005. She released her first Japanese single "Mayonaka no Door" with Sony Music on July 19, 2006. Her debut album Liu Yifei was released the next month in various parts of Asia such as mainland China, Hong Kong and throughout Southeast Asia, featuring a diverse music repertoire including rap and soft rock. In the same year, Liu also released her Japanese album in which the single, "Mayonaka no Door" was chosen to be an ending theme for the anime series Demashita! Powerpuff Girls Z by TV Tokyo.

In 2020, she performed the Mandarin and English version of the song "Reflection" for the live-action Mulan.

Filmography

Film

Television series

Discography

Albums

Singles

Soundtracks

Awards and nominations

Competitive feature film festivals main competition unit

Other film awards

Forbes China Celebrity 100

Notes

References

External links

 
 
 

1987 births
Living people
21st-century American actresses
21st-century Chinese actresses
Actresses from New York City
Actresses from Wuhan
American women pop singers
American film actresses
American television actresses
Beijing Film Academy alumni
Chinese emigrants to the United States
Chinese women singers
Chinese film actresses
Chinese Mandopop singers
Chinese television actresses
Japanese-language singers of China
Musicians from Wuhan
People from Douglaston–Little Neck, Queens
Singers from Hubei
Singers from New York City
Sony Music Entertainment Japan artists
People who lost Chinese citizenship
Naturalized citizens of the United States